This is the order of battle for Operation Cobra, a World War II American offensive against German forces in Normandy, France that lasted 25-31 July 1944.

American order of battle
  First Army
 Lieutenant General Omar N. Bradley

VII Corps

 Major General J. Lawton Collins
  1st Infantry "Big Red One" Division
 Major General Clarence R. Huebner
 Infantry: 16th, 18th, 26th Infantry Regiments
 Artillery–105mm: 7th, 32nd, 33rd Field Artillery Battalions
 Artillery–155mm: 5th Field Artillery Battalion
 Armor: 745th Tank Battalion, 635th Tank Destroyer Battalions
  4th Infantry "Ivy" Division
 Major General Raymond O. Barton
 Infantry: 8th, 12th, 22nd Infantry Regiments
 Artillery–105mm: 29th, 42nd, 44th Field Artillery Battalions
 Artillery–155mm: 20th Field Artillery Battalion 
 Armor: 70th Tank Battalion, 801st Tank Destroyer Battalion
  9th Infantry "Old Reliables" Division
 Major General Manton S. Eddy
 Infantry: 39th, 47th, 60th Infantry Regiments
 Artillery–105mm: 26th, 60th, 84th Field Artillery Battalions
 Artillery–155mm: 34th Field Artillery Battalion
 Armor: 746th Tank Battalion
  30th Infantry "Old Hickory" Division
 Major General Leland S. Hobbs
 Infantry: 117th, 119th, 120th Infantry Regiments
 Artillery–105mm: 7th, 32nd, 33rd Field Artillery Battalions
 Artillery–155mm: 5th Field Artillery Battalion
 Armor: 743rd Tank Battalion, 823rd Tank Destroyer Battalion
  2nd Armored "Hell on Wheels" Division
 Major General Edward H. Brooks
 Armor: 66th, 67th Armored Regiments, 82nd Armored Reconnaissance Battalion 
 Artillery: 14th, 78th, 92nd Armored Field Artillery Battalions
 Infantry: 41st Armored Infantry Regiment
  3rd Armored "Spearhead" Division
 Major General Leroy H. Watson
 Armor: 32nd, 33rd Armored Regiments, 36th Armored Reconnaissance Battalion 
 Artillery: 54th, 67th, 391st Armored Field Artillery Battalions

VIII Corps 

 Major General Troy H. Middleton
  8th Infantry "Pathfinder" Division
 Major General Donald A. Stroh
 Infantry: 13th, 28th, 121st Infantry Regiments
 Artillery–105mm: 43rd, 45th, 56th Field Artillery Battalions
 Artillery–155mm: 28th Field Artillery Battalion
 Armor: 709th Tank Battalion, 644th Tank Destroyer Battalion
  79th Infantry "Cross of Lorraine" Division
 Major General Ira T. Wyche
 Infantry: 317th, 318th, 319th Infantry Regiments
 Artillery–105mm: 313th, 314th, 905th Field Artillery Battalions
 Artillery–155mm: 315th Field Artillery Battalion
 Armor: 749th Tank Battalion, 813th Tank Destroyer Battalion
  83rd Infantry "Thunderbolt" Division
 Major General Robert C. Macon
 Infantry: 329th, 330th, 331st Infantry Regiments
 Artillery–105mm: 322nd, 323rd, 908th Field Artillery Battalions
 Artillery–155mm: 324th Field Artillery Battalion
 Armor: 802nd Tank Destroyer Battalion
  90th Infantry "Tough 'Ombres" Division
 Major General Eugene M. Landrum
 Infantry: 357th, 358th, 359th Infantry Regiments
 Artillery–105mm: 343rd, 344th, 915th Field Artillery Battalions
 Artillery–155mm: 345th Field Artillery Battalion
 Armor: 712th Tank Battalion, 607th Tank Destroyer Battalion
  4th Armored Division
 Major General John S. Wood
 Armor: 8th, 35th, 37th Tank Battalions
 Artillery: 22nd, 66th, 94th Armored Field Artillery Battalions
 Infantry: 10th, 51st, 53rd Armored Infantry Battalions
  6th Armored Division
 Major General Robert W. Grow
 Armor: 15th, 68th, 69th Tank Battalions
 Artillery: 128th, 212nd, 231st Armored Field Artillery Battalions
 Infantry: 9th, 44th, 50th Armored Infantry Battalions

XIX Corps 

 Major General Charles H. Corlett
  28th Infantry Division
 Major General Lloyd D. Brown
 Infantry: 109th, 110th,  112th Infantry Regiments
 Artillery–105mm: 322nd, 323rd, 908th Field Artillery Battalions
 Artillery–155mm: 324th Field Artillery Battalion
 Armor: 744th Tank Battalion, 630th Tank Destroyer Battalion
  29th Infantry Division
 Major General Charles H. Gerhardt
 Infantry: 115th, 116th,  175th Infantry Regiments
 Artillery–105mm: 322nd, 323rd, 908th Field Artillery Battalions
 Artillery–155mm: 324th Field Artillery Battalion
 Armor: 747th Tank Battalion, 803rd Tank Destroyer Battalion
  35th Infantry Division
 Major General Paul W. Baade
 Infantry: 134th, 137th, 320th Infantry Regiments
 Artillery–105mm: 161st, 216th, 219th Field Artillery Battalions
 Artillery–155mm: 127th Field Artillery Battalion
 Armor: 737th Tank Battalion, 654th Tank Destroyer Battalion

German order of battle

Seventh Army
SS-Obergruppenführer Paul Hausser

II Parachute Corps 

 Generalleutnant Eugen Meindl
  5th Fallschirmjäger Division
 Generalleutnant Gustav Wilke
 13th, 14th, and 15th Parachute Infantry Regiments
 5th Artillery Regiment
  2nd Panzer Division
 Generalleutnant Heinrich Freiherr von Lüttwitz
 3rd Panzer Regiment
 2nd and 304th Panzergrenadier Regiments
 74th Artillery Regiment
  Panzer Lehr Division
 Generalmajor Fritz Bayerlein
 130th Panzer Regiment
 901st and 902nd Panzergrenadier Regiments
 130th Artillery Regiment

LXXXIV Corps 

 Generalleutnant Dietrich von Choltitz
  2nd SS Panzer Division
 Sturmbannführer Christian Tychsen
  17th SS Panzergrenadier Division
 Brigadeführer Otto Baum
  116th Panzer Division
 General der Panzertruppen Gerhard von Schwerin
 16th Panzer Regiment
 60th and 156th Panzergrenadier Regiments
 146th Artillery Regiment
  352nd Infantry Division
 Generalleutnant Dietrich Kraiss
 914th, 915th, and 916th Volksgrenadier Regiments
 352nd Artillery Regiment

Notes

Footnotes

Citations

References
 
 
 

World War II orders of battle
Operation Overlord
Battles of World War II involving the United States
Military operations of World War II involving Germany